Sashana Carolyn Campbell (born 2 March 1991) is a Jamaican footballer who plays as a defender for the Jamaica women's national team.

Career
Campbell attended Darton College and the University of West Florida before embarking on a professional career.

In April 2022, Campbell joined Polish club Medyk Konin.

International goals
Scores and results list Jamaica's goal tally first.

References

External links
 Sashana Campbell at the Israel Football Association website
 
 Sashana Campbell at The FIFA Women's Worldcup France 2019 website

1991 births
Living people
People from Manchester Parish
Jamaican women's footballers
Women's association football midfielders
Women's association football central defenders
Sashana Campbell
Maccabi Kishronot Hadera F.C. players
Ligat Nashim players
Jamaica women's international footballers
2019 FIFA Women's World Cup players
Pan American Games competitors for Jamaica
Footballers at the 2019 Pan American Games
Jamaican expatriate women's footballers
Jamaican expatriate sportspeople in Iceland
Expatriate women's footballers in Iceland
Jamaican expatriate sportspeople in Israel
Expatriate women's footballers in Israel
Jamaican expatriate sportspeople in the United States
Expatriate women's soccer players in the United States
Darton State Cavaliers women's soccer players
West Florida Argonauts women's soccer players